Ekaterina Bassi (born 16 February 1977) is a Greek taekwondo practitioner.

She won a silver medal in middleweight at the 1993 World Taekwondo Championships, after being defeated by Park Eun-sun in the final. Her achievements at the European Taekwondo Championships include a silver medal in 1998, and a bronze medal in 1994.

References

External links

1977 births
Living people
Greek female taekwondo practitioners
European Taekwondo Championships medalists
World Taekwondo Championships medalists
20th-century Greek women